Quimper Cathedral,  or at greater length the Cathedral of Saint Corentin, Quimper, is a Roman Catholic cathedral and national monument of Brittany in France. It is located in the town of Quimper and is the seat of the Diocese of Quimper and Léon. Saint Corentin was its first bishop.

The cathedral is notable in that, unlike other Gothic cathedrals, it slightly bends in the middle to match the contours of its location, and avoid an area that was swampy at the time of the construction. The cathedral was the site of a devastating fire in 1620 when the bell tower was burned and the populace saw a green devil in the flames.

According to legend King Gradlon met Saint Corentin on the mountain Mėnez-Hom and was so impressed by the strength of his religious faith that he invited the hermit to become Bishop of Quimper.

The cathedral replaced an old Roman church which had a chapel attached to it called the "Chapelle de la Victoire" where Alain Canhiart was buried in 1058. It was in 1239 that the first part of the cathedral was built when Bishop Rainaud commissioned the building of the choir, but it was not until the coming of Duke Jean V at the beginning of the 15th century that momentum gathered and the choir was covered with crisscross vaulting. In the same century, the western side of the cathedral and the nave emerged. The French Revolution and the subsequent Terror put paid to further progress, but after the Concordat of 1801, restoration of the cathedral followed as well as some additional construction.

When the cathedral was completed the choir was out of line with the nave, having a slight curve to the left, this to avoid disturbing the older chapel which contained the tomb of Alain Canhiart. Thus the cathedral has an odd shape, and rather imaginatively some have likened the top part of the cathedral's inclination to the left as suggesting Christ's head leaning to the left when he hung on the cross.

The cathedral exterior
There are several entrances (portals) to the cathedral: the three north portals, the south portal known as the "Porche de la Vierge" and the magnificent west portal.

The north portals
There are three portals on the cathedral's north side, "La façade septentrionale".. On the far right is the "Porche des Baptêmes", which leads to the north nave. The portal comprises a double door separated by a trumeau. Above the doors in a triangular pediment are the arms of Canon Pierre du Quenquis, whilst at the top of the pediment are the arms of Jean V with the motto "À ma vie" and the crest of his wife Jeanne de France in a diamond-shaped lozenge carried by a dove. Just below this are the arms of Monseigneur Bertrand de Rosmadec with the motto "En Bon Espoir". To the left and right of the pediment are the arms of the Barons of Nėvet and Guengat. The "Porche de la Chandeleur" is located at the northern end of the transept and was built between 1475 and 1479 by the mason Pierre Le Goaraguer and his son Guillaume. The single door is surmounted by a triangular pediment and the arch's external voussures are decorated with carvings of acanthus leaves. Above the door is an ornate finial above which is a "hermine passant" (i.e., a stoat passant). The third portal, situated between the "Porche des Baptêmes" and the "Porche de la Chandeleur", is small and in earlier times gave access to the ossuary and cemetery;  it is no longer used.

The western façade of Saint-Corentin cathedral and the west portal

The west façade of the cathedral comprises two great spires and a magnificent portal with a series of angels decorating the arch's voussoirs. On the trumeau is a statue of Christ giving a blessing whilst holding a globe and treading on a grimacing demon. Before 1793, the sculpture on the trumeau had been an equestrian figure in granite of Jean V but that was destroyed in that year. At the top of an arch between the two spires there is a statue of the legendary King Gradlon. The first stone of the western facade was laid on 26 July 1424 by Monseigneur Bertrand de Rosmadec in the presence of a representative of Jean V, the Duke of Bretagne. Both within and without the triangular pediment above the voussoirs, are many crests and mottos including the crest of the helmeted lion of Montfort holding a standard bearing the words "Malo au riche duc!", the battle-cry of Breton dukes, the arms of Jean V, the Duke of Bretagne's three sons, the crest of Jeanne de France, Guillaume de Rosmadec, Bertrand de Rosmadec, the barons of Névet with the motto "Pérag?" "Pourquoi?" and the motto of the nobles of Bodigneau and Clohars-Fouesnant "À l'aventure!", whilst on the right and near a helmet decorated with valances is the motto of the nobles of Guengat "Léal à ma Foy" and the arms of the nobles of Quélenec.

The cathedral's south portal
The south portal is part of the "facade mėridionale" or "south facade" and is known as the "Porche de la Vierge" or the "Porche de Sainte Catherine". It has a statue of the Virgin Mary with child in the tympanum, with angels wafting censers on either side. She is seated and below her feet is the bust of an angel with spread wings. The child she holds is gently stroking a bird which he carries. In a niche in one of the buttresses there is a statue of Catherine of Alexandria carved from kersanton. Above the door is a triangular pediment with three ėcussons ("crests or shields") including the crest of the Duchess Jeanne de France surmounted by the "hermine passante" ("passing stoat"), the emblem of Brittany, with the inscription "A ma vie". Also shown are the arms and mottos of Monseigneur de Rosmadec and Guillaume de Rosmadec.  Just outside of the pediment are the crests of the Bodigneau family and the family Quėlennec. The voussoirs in the upper part of the portal's arch depict 8 angels playing instruments. The niches in the lower voussoirs are empty.

The cathedral interior
The Saint-Corentin cathedral has numerous stained glass windows and chapels and to avoid confusion, this guide will describe items of interest starting from the west portal and work around the church starting from the left and moving in a clock-wise direction. We shall describe items of interest along the north side of the nave, then the north side of the transept followed by the north side of the choir. We then move around the ambulatory, past the abside and the Notre-Dame de la Victoire chapel and return to the west portal  via the south sides of the choir, transept and nave. We shall deal with the mostly 19th-century stained glass as we make this circuit and then return to describe the far older stained glass of the cathedral's upper level.

The north-facing side of the nave – lower level
After entering the cathedral through the west portal, and passing two stoups on either side of the entrance, these topped with sculptures of angels, we turn to the left (north) side of the nave and reach the Chapelle des Fonts baptismaux; in effect the Baptistery

Chapelle des Fonts baptismaux/Baptistery. Bay 33
The  "Chapelle des Fonts baptismaux" has a rather modest marble font and on the left side of the chapel an alabaster statue of John the Baptist stands with his back to a leafy tree, bedecked with birds. There is a cavalier at his feet. This work is, in fact, English and was obtained by Monseigneur René Nicolas Sergent from the church at Kérity-Penmarc'h. It is also known as the "Saint Jean des Oiseaux". It is two metres high. John the Baptist wears the skin of a camel whose head dangles by John the Baptist's feet. He carries a prayer book and a lamb. The stained glass window is modern, dating to 1981, and is the work of the artist Josette Mahuzier of the Gruber atelier. The theme of the window is the part played by water in certain parts of the bible and the concept of the baptism. On the north side of the chapel is the gisant of Monseigneur Roul Le Moël,  chaplain to Charles VIII, and the Bishop of Cornouaille from 1493 to 1501. The original gisant had been destroyed during the revolution and the replacement is carved from the distinctive dark kersanton stone. One can see Raoul Le Moël's coat of arms in the chapel keystone. In the chapel there is also a carving in wood and dating to the 17th-century representing Notre Dame du Guéodet which had come from a church, now destroyed, the Église Notre-Dame du Guéodet.

Grisaille. Bay 31
As we turn along the north side of the nave we encounter a Grisaille. See also Bay 32.

Chapelle des "Trois Gouttes de Sang". Bay 29
The next chapel in sequence, the chapel called the Chapelle des "Trois Gouttes de Sang", recalls and depicts the story of a rich Quimper knight who had left his money and possessions with a friend before going off to the crusades. On his return several years later, this friend denied all knowledge of the transaction. The knight having kept nothing in writing and having no witnesses, took the dispute before the "Tribunal de l'Evêque" where the recipient of the money was challenged to make an oath in the cathedral, confirming his denial. He did so before several witnesses and before a crucifix which at that time stood before the cathedral chevet. As he made the oath and as a reaction to this act of perjury, three drops of blood were shed by the figure of Christ on the crucifix onto the altar tablecloth. This blood was subsequently collected into a reliquary and is placed on the Chapelle des "Trois Gouttes de Sang"'s altar, along with the tablecloth and along with Jesus' head from the crucifix which had been broken off by French revolutionaries when they desecrated the cathedral. This head has in fact been carefully analysed and dates to the 12th century. Hirsch's stained glass window in this chapel dates to 1869 and depicts the friend's act of perjury before the knight and his wife, a bishop and judges. There are also two Yann Dargent frescoes in the chapel, one depicting the nativity and the second the visit of the three wise men and the shepherds.

In the chapel there is also a statue of Sainte-Thérèse holding the infant Jesus and a plaque marking the tomb bricked up into the chapel wall of Monseigneur Francis Barbu who was the Bishop of Quimper from 1968 to 1989. On this plaque is a medallion depicting Barbu by the sculptor Pierre Toulhoat. Barbu is the last bishop to be buried in the cathedral

Vitrail de saint Guénolé et de saint Ronan. Bay 27
The 19th-century window in the next bay celebrates the lives of the two evangelist saints, Guénolé and Ronan who preached in Basse Bretagne. Saint Guénolé had founded the abbey at Landévennec and Saint Ronan was a hermit who lived at Locronan.  In front of the window is a statue of Joan of Arc dressed for battle and carrying a flag. The window depicts various episodes in the lives of Guénolé and Ronan. Depictions include Ronan being baptised, his hermitage at Léon, Saint Patrick appearing to Guénolé and Guénolé helping Grallon to die. The window dates to 1874 and was the work of Hirsch. The eight panels to the left relate to Saint Guénolé and those on the right side to Saint Ronan.

Vitrail de saint Paul-Aurélien. Bay 25
The next window celebrates the life of Paul Aurélian (known as Paol Aorelian or Saint Pol de Léon). He was a 6th-century Welshman who became the first bishop of the diocese of Léon and was one of the seven founder saints of Brittany.  Paul became a pupil of Saint Iidut at Llantwit Major and lived on Caldey Island with Samson of Dol and Gildas.  He went to Brittany, establishing monasteries in Finistère at Ouessant on the north-west coast of Brittany, and at Lampaul on the island of Ushant, on the island of Batz and at Ocsimor, now the city of Saint-Pol-de-Léon, where he is said to have founded a monastery in an abandoned fort. He was consecrated bishop there under the authority of Childebert, King of the Franks. The stained glass window depicts scenes from St Pol's life, including events with Ildut, his conversion of King Mark, his receiving an order to leave Great Britain, and his death in Batz. The window is attributed to Hirsch and dates to 1874.

Vitrail de Saint Yves. Bay 23
Saint Yves was a 13th-century saint and is the patron saint of Brittany.  Canonised in recognition of his virtue, he was a lawyer and a judge renown for his advocacy on behalf of the poor. The stained glass window depicts some scenes concerning Saint-Yves' life. Scenes include Yves being ordained as a priest, the time when he sold his horse in Tréguier to help the poor, Jesus appearing to Yves as a leper, his giving up his room for a beggar, the miracle where he caused trees to grow to replace those cut down to build the cathedral and his death on 19 May 1303. The coats of arms of Poulguinan and Monseigneur François Hyacinthe de Ploeuc are also shown. Beneath the window dedicated to Saint Yves is the tomb and gisant of Monseigneur François Hyacinthe de Ploeuc, Bishop of Quimper from 1709 to 1739. The door placed here has a fine carving of the head of a cherub and on the wall to the right of the door is a sculpture depicting Saint Yves sitting between a rich and a poor man.

The north side of the transept
We then arrive at the north transept and the Porche de la Chandeleur and the Chapelle des Trėpassės or the Chapelle de la Sainte Croix. This chapel served for years as a place for funeral services (Chapelle des Trėpassės means "the chapel of the dead") and has a large altar and some stalls. The altar is dedicated to Sainte-Croix and points to the north and its paintings are attributed to the artist Icart. In the chapel are statues of Saint Guėnolė, the first abbot of Landėvennec and Saint Conogan, the second Bishop of Quimper. He was a saint who was invoked to cure people of the fever. There is also a statue of Saint Anthony with a small pig at his feet and a female saint holding a tower. Also high up on the north wall of the transept is the stained glass window entitled "Vingt-Huit Saints Armoricains, Lėonards et Cornouaillais" (Bay 117)

The north-facing side of the choir – lower level
On the lower level of the north side of the choir are four chapels; La chapelle de Saint-Pierre, the Chapelle de Saint-Frédéric, the Chapelle de Saint-Roch and the Chapelle de Saint-Corentin

La chapelle de Saint-Pierre. Bay 21

After crossing the transept, we arrive at the Chapelle de Saint-Pierre. The chapel walls evoke "la collation des pouvoirs de lier et délier à saint Pierre". The stained glass window of 1856 by Lobin of Tours recalls the restoration of the cathedral's spires at the time of Monseigneur Joseph Marie Graveran. In the stained glass window, the bishop, presented by Saint Joseph, kneels and offers a maquette of the spires to the Virgin Mary and Saint Corentin. The window was a gift to the cathedral from Mme Mascarėne de Rivière. Graveran's grave nearby, the work of Amėdėe Mėnard, is marked by a limestone statue. There is also a plaque dedicated to Monseigner André Fauvel who was bishop of Quimper and Lėon from 1947 to 1968 . Finally, the chapel has a painting showing Saint Peter kneeling in front of Jesus. The altar is of onyx and decorated with images. That in the centre depicts Jesus handing the keys to heaven to Saint Pierre (Peter), that on the left depicts Jesus entrusting Saint Pierre with the lambs and sheep and Saint Pierre walking on water. The chapel has frescoes by Yann Dargent, one above the altar and the other in the arcade tympanum. They depict Jesus handing the keys to Saint Pierre in the presence of the other apostles and Pierre bereft and in tears after he had denied Jesus. There are no statues in this chapel. Apart from Graveran's tomb, evidence of two bricked in tombs ("enfeus") can be seen in the chapel's north wall. The coats of arms here were chiselled away during the days of the revolution. In these tombs are the remains of Alain Le Baud, Yvon Le Baud, François Cochet and Jehanne du Cluziou, a noblewoman from Poulgazet. The tomb of Graveran is inscribed-"HIC JACET JOSEPHUS-MARIA GRAVERAN EPISCOPUS CORISOPITENSIS ET LEONENSIS, ANNOS VIXIT LXI, MENSE X, DIES XVI, OBIIT DIE I FEBRUARII IN PACE".

Chapelle de Saint-Frédéric. Bay 19
The next chapel in bay 21 is the  Chapelle de Saint-Frédéric. The stained glass window and paintings in this chapel celebrate the life and martyrdom of Saint-Frédéric (Frédéric d'Utrecht).  Saint-Frédéric had originally come from Utrecht and had served as the Bishop of Walcheren in the time of Louis le Débonnaire. The chapel has a fine altar combining marble and gilded bronze and on the sides of the altar are statues depicting Saint Mathurin and Saint Frédéric, the latter holding an open book and pointing to the page opened. The two paintings in the chapel are by Yann Dargent and depict Frédéric d'Utrecht's martyrdom and a scene where he reproaches Queen Judith. The stained glass window, a gift to the cathedral from Louise Bonnemaison of Quimper, holds 16 medallions depicting scenes from Frédéric d'Utrecht's life, including his ordination, his reproaches to Queen Judith, his being attacked and murdered during mass at a church in Maestricht and his body being taken to Utrecht. Signatures on the window include that of E.Hirsch and Mongin Maillė.  Louise Bonnemaison had also helped to fund the restoration of the chapel. The chapel also contains the tombs of Bishop Y.Cabellic and Canon Olivier de Conquer.

Chapelle de Saint-Roch. Bay 17
The stained glass window in the Chapelle de Saint Roch, the Vitrail de saint Roch, contains 16 medallions depicting scenes from the saint's life. The window is attributed to Hirsch and dates to 1869.  The scenes include his birth, the pilgrimage to Rome, his attempt to cure victims of the plague in a hospital, his catching that disease himself, a visit from an angel, a dog bringing him nourishment; his being visited by Monseigneur Gothard, his converting Gothard, his being sick in hospital, his recognition by the prison governor his uncle and his funeral. Two frescoes by Yann Dargent complete the chapel's decoration. One shows Saint-Roch curing the sick and the second his stay in a forest as a recluse. The Montpellier born Saint Roch was a saint especially invoked against the plague. There are statues in the chapel of Saint Francis of Assisi and Saint Roch himself. The chapel also holds the tomb of Monseigneur Valleau who died in 1898. The chapel altar is made from limestone and is decorated with polychrome paintings.

Chapelle de Saint-Corentin. Bay 15
The Chapelle de Saint-Corentin altar, made by the goldsmith Poussielque, has a reliquary cabinet ("armoire reliquaire") holding the arm Saint Corentin. This reliquary is decorated with a bas-relief depicting Jacques Dhuisseau handing the saint's arm to the bishop Guillaume Le Prestre de Lézonnet in the presence of Guillaume Le Gouverneur, the bishop of Saint-Malo, and various clerics. The arm is held in a crystal cylinder which is carried by models of various bishops. The chapel is also the site of the tomb and gisant of Monseigneur Nouvel de La Flèche, a Benedictine monk who served as bishop of Quimper from 1872 to 1887. It was Nouvel de la Flèche who had had Yann Dargent execute the various frescoes in the cathedral, originally commissioned by his predecessor, Monseigneur Sergent, who had had the apsidal chapel restored by Bigot and had had the relic of Saint Corentin placed in the Saint Corentin chapel. Canon Jean de Marc'hallac'h is also buried in the chapel. The stained glass window relates, in 16 medallions, the story of Saint-Corentin's life. Dargent's frescoes here, placed above the altar, depict angels carrying the saint up to heaven and Saint-Corentin meeting Saint Primel. On either side of the altar are statues of Saint Corentin with a fish at his feet and Saint Primel.
The windows show his connections to King Gradlon, to Saint Guénolé and Tudy. Scenes include Corentin building his hermitage, praying before a menhir, visiting Primel, his receiving Gradlon, his blessing of the Abbots Guénolé and Tudy, on his deathbed but still blessing clerics and his funeral. A plaque nearby reminds us of the legend that relates to how Saint-Corentin fed himself with fish from his fountain. Each day he caught a fish, ate half of it and threw the rest back in the fountain. The next day he was able to catch the fish again which was now whole.

The north ambulatory
Next we start to walk around the north ambulatory and encounter the painting by Yann Dargent called "Miracle en faveur du P Maunoir". In Dargent's painting, Père Julien Mannoir, a missionary, is miraculously given the gift of the Breton language by an angel to enable him preach in Brittany.

Vitrail de Saint Guėnaël. Bay 13

Next we encounter the door to the sacristry and a walled-up window protected by a massive grill. It seems that this walled up window had given access to one of the corridors of the sacristy.  Above this grilled arch there is a stained glass window, the work of Louis Plonquet in 1904, this known as the "Vitrail de Saint Guėnaël". This shows a young man, Saint Guenaël asking Saint Guénolé, then the abbot of Landévennec and on a visit to Quimper, to take him to his monastery so that he could live in the service of God.("y passer sa vie au service de Dieu"). Saint Guėnaël became abbot of Landévennec after Saint Guénolé's death. Here there are also murals by Yann Dargent depicting Corentin in conversation with Primel and his being carried to heaven by angels.

Vocation de Saint Mélar. Bay 11

This window tells the story of Saint Mélar who as a boy had his right hand cut off to stop him holding a sword and his left foot removed to stop him mounting a horse. In the window he and his father, Saint Miliau, with some soldiers and monks, stand before the bishop.  Mélar, now wearing a false hand, holds out the severed hand. Saint Miliau had been killed by his brother Rivode who was also responsible for the attack on Saint Mélar. This window is by Louis Plonquet and dates to 1904.

Mort de Saint Corentin. Bay 11

In Bay 11 on the north side of the ambulatory and to the right of the entry to the sacristy is the window entitled "Mort  de Saint Corentin". The dying Saint Corentin is depicted in the central panel and around this are lancets depicting the six main sanctuaries of Cornouaille devoted to the Virgin Mary. These are Notre-Dame de Rumengol, Notre-Dame de Quimperlė, Notre-Dame de Confort, Notre Dames des Portes, Notre-Dame des Cieux and Notre-Dame de Châteaulin.

Proclamation du dogme de l'Immaculėe Conception. Bay 9
In Bay 9 of the north side of the ambulatory is this window attributed to Lavergne. In the centre of the window two panels recall the history of the dogma surrounding the concept of the Immaculate Conception whilst around this several panels celebrate the sanctuaries in Lėon and Trėgor devoted to the Virgin Mary. One panel recalls Notre-Dame de Berven, and others Notre-Dame de Kreisker, Notre-Dame auxiliatrice at Lesneven, Notre-Dame du Mur, Notre-Dame du Folgoët and Notre-Dame de Kernitron.

The abside and the absidial chapel – Chapelle de Notre – Dame des Victoires
At the eastern end of the cathedral we come to the apse or the chevet. Radiating apse chapels outside the choir aisle were common in France at the beginning of the 13th century, the complete structure of apse, choir and radiating chapel becoming known as the chevet which can be translated as "headpiece".  Famous northern French examples of chevets are in the Gothic cathedrals of Amiens, Beauvais and Reims.  In the Saint-Corentin cathedral, the apsidal chapel is called the 'Chapelle de Notre-Dame des Victoires. It  had first been known as the Chapel de Notre-Dame, then the Chapelle Neuve, then the Chapelle de la Trinité, or the Chapelle du Saint-Sacrement, the latter because the chapel's altar has a tabernacle containing the "Saintes Espèces". It is a place for prayer and contemplation. It was built in 1028 by the Compte de Cornouaiile.  Alain Canhiart was buried in the chapel in 1058, following a vow made by Canhiart that his armies would be successful in the battle of Locronan. When in 1239, Monseigneur Raynaud planned the construction of the choir of the new cathedral, the decision was made to add the old chapel to the choir, this being one of the reasons for the odd shape of the cathedral with the choir leaning slightly to the left of the transept. This joining of the chapel to the cathedral choir meant that it needed some reconstruction including vaulting and some elegant columns (Colonnettes), and enlargement of the ambulatory and an arcade where the chapel joined the choir. The altar is of granite and was consecrated by Monseigneur Alain Rivelen in 1295. The chapel holds the tombs of Bishop Even de la Forêt who died in 1290 and Bishop Gatien de Monceaux who died in 1416. There are also inscriptions on the altar which state that the hearts of two further bishops, Monseigneur Dombideau and Monseigneur de Pouliquet are contained in lead boxes which were built into the chapel wall.

There are five stained glass windows in the Notre-Dame de la Victoire chapel. These are:-

Nativitė aux Bergers. Bay 0
The central stained glass window in the chapel, that on the east wall, depicts the nativity and is known as the Vitrail de la Nativité du Sauveur or Vitrail de l'Adoration des Bergers/Nativitė aux Bergers, a work dating to 1868 by the Strasbourg born artist Louis Charles Auguste Steinheil and commissioned by Monseigneur Renė Nicolas Sergent. The Virgin Mary is beautifully drawn in a blue robe and proudly showing her child to the kneeling shepherds. Joseph looks on and in the first of the four lancets a passing woman (La "Belle Jardinière") looks across at the scene. She holds the hand of a small child. The historian Le Man described this as the most beautiful of the cathedral's modern windows ("incontestablement le plus beau vitrail moderne de la cathėdrale"). In the window's tracery two angels, their green wings spread, plunge earthwards. One holds a banner inscribed "Gloria in excelsis Deo" whilst the second has her hands clasped in adoration.

Communion de la Vierge. Bay 1
This two lancet window is in bay 1 on the north side of the chapel and is placed above the enfeu of Monseigneur Gatien de Monceaux. It depicts John the Evangelist giving communion to the Virgin Mary or Communion de la Vierge, remise par saint Jean, assisté d’Etienne.  It is signed G.C.L (Georges Claudius Lavergne) and dates to around 1891. In the tracery are the arms of three Quimper bishops, Gatien de Monceaux, Pierre-Vincent Dombidau and Jean-Marie Dominique de Poulpiquet.  Across John's chasuble run some of the words from John 6. verse 48 to 59."EGO SUM [PANIS VITAE]" ("I am the bread of life") and "HIC EST PANIS QUI CAELJO DESCENDIT" ("Here is the bread which has come from heaven").

Dormition de la Vierge. Bay 2
This four lancet window is in bay 2 on the south side of the Notre-Dame de la Victoire chapel. Another Lavergne window, dated to 1891, it depicts the dying Virgin Mary surrounded by 12 people some of whose names are inscribed in the halos above their heads. In the tracery Christ opens his arms ready to receive his mother. Also in bay 2 there is a smaller window to the right of the credenza which depicts two doves perched on the edge of a vase.

Saint Corentin reçoit la Donation du roi Gradlon. Bay 3
This two lancet window by Lavergne dates to 1891 and occupies bay 3 on the north side of the Notre-Dame de la Victoire chapel. It is positioned above the enfeu of Monseigneur Even de la Forêt. The king holds a maquette of the chapel and presents it to Saint Corentin who stands next to a statue of the Virgin Mary with child.  With Gradlon are Saint Guėnolė and Darėrėa, Gradlon's wife.

Voeu d'Alain Canhiart d'ėriger La Chapelle Notre-Dame de la Victoire. Bay 4
In bay 4 on the south side of the chapel Notre-Dame de la Victoire is the window "Voeu d'Alain Canhiart d'ėriger La Chapelle Notre-Dame de la Victoire" a window celebrating Alain Canhiart's vow to erect a chapel if successful in his battle against the Duke of Bretagne, Alain III. The window is signed Georges Cl.Lavergne.1891.

The central and south ambulatory
We now leave the Notre-Dame de la Victoire chapel and enter the ambulatory. We encounter two windows in this area, one on either side of the chapel entrance.  To the left of the entrance to the chapel Notre-Dame de la Victoire is the Hirsch window "Prėsentation de Julien Maunoir à Monseigneur Louët par Michel Le Nobletz".

Prėsentation de Julien Maunoir à Monseigneur du Louët par Michel Le Nobletz. Bay 5

This window was erected as a tribute to Renė du Louët, the Bishop of Cornouaille from 1640 to 1668.  His tomb is located below the window. The window depicts Michel Le Nobletz presenting Julien Maunoir to du Louēt.  Le Nobletz and Maunoir were important Breton missionaries. Michel Le Nobletz was born in 1577 in Plouguerneau in Léon and Maunoir was born in 1606 in Saint-Georges-de-Reintembault.

Protestation contre La Constitution civile du Clergė. Bay 6
This four lancet window by Hirsch depicts Touissant Conen de Saint Luc, Bishop of Cornouille, delivering the "Protestation contre La Constitution civile du Clergė" to Pope Pie V1. The window is located to the right of the entrance to the apsidal chapel.

La chapelle Notre-Dame du Rosaire. Bay 7
Next we arrive at the La chapelle Notre-Dame du Rosaire or Chapelle de N.D. des Carmes in the ambulatory's north side, where we find the Vitrail du Rosaire depicting the Virgin Mary handing the rosary to Saint Dominic and Saint Catherine of Sienna and around this central scene, 15 medallions depict the various "mysteries", those of joy, of sadness and of glory. This window was given to the cathedral by Abbė Jules Guillard.

Monseigneur René Nicolas Sergent was buried in the chapel Notre-Dame des Carmes on 2 August 1871 in an enfeu created shortly before his death. He is depicted laying on a tomb carved from kersanton stone and made by Quimper masons. His statue came from the Lorient workshop of Le Brun. On the base of the enfeu, a marble plaque is inscribed "Renatus-Nicolaus Sergent. Episcopus. Corisopitensis, et. Leonensis.Sancti. Corentini, nostri. sedem. XVI. annos. immigre. tenuit. Ecclesiam. Cathedralem. magnificentissimus. ornavit. Fidem. inconcussam. in. synodo. Vaticano . fideliter. firmiterque. professus. est. Obiit. die. XXV. Julii. anno. M. DCCCLXXI. in. pace". Between Sergent's tomb and the chapel's altar, is a white marble statue of the Virgin Mary holding baby Jesus in her arms. This was a gift to the cathedral from a Mr Guillou of Quimper and was the work of Auguste Ottin.

Chapelle des Saints Anges. Bay 8
Leaving the apsidal chapel we turn south along the ambulatory to reach the "Chapelle des Saints Anges". The chapel's altarpiece is an alabaster work dating to the 15th century which features a seated Christ giving a blessing alongside figures representing the four cardinal virtues. This altarpiece was originally the pedestal for the statue of John the Baptist in the baptistry. The stained glass window, attributed to Hirsch and dated 1871, depicts various scenes from the Acts of the Apostles showing the intervention of angels and in particular the guardian angel in the life of Saint Pierre. It is known as the Vitrail des saints Anges or the Libération de Saint Paul.  On a pillar to the right of the altar is the statue and the relics of Santig Du, otherwise known as Jean Discalcéat. The statue is carved from wood. Santig Du/Santik Du ("petit saint noir"), originally from Léon, had devoted his life to the poor and died in 1349 from the plague, caught no doubt from the time spent living amongst and trying to assist plague victims.  Under the statue, a reliquary is said to hold a small piece of Santig Du's brain.

Le vitrail de Saint Louis. Bay 10
The next window, a gift from Monseigneur Jacquelot du Boisrouvray, illustrates events in the life of the French king, Saint Louis. It comprises 16 medallions which depict the main events in the king's life. These include his education by Blanche de Castille, his imprisonment and his participation in the crusades. The window is by Hirsch and A.Mongin.

Le vitrail de Santig Du. Bay 12

This stained glass window, also known as the Vitrail d'Anna Stein, the Hungarian artist who produced it, is a 1993 window honouring Santig Du/Santik Du ("petit saint noir") or Jean Discalcéat, a Quimper franciscain monk who did so much to support the poor and the sick in the 14th century. Nearby a statue and a relic and a plaque telling the story of bread left on a table to feed the poor. Next we come to the gisant and tomb of the Bishop of Quimper, Monseigneur Geffroy Le Marhec'h, who died in 1383 and in a recess a statue of Saint Antoine.

Le Vitrail de saint Renė d'Anger. Bay 14
The Vitrail de saint-René d'Angers tells the story of his life. Panels include a depiction of his resuscitation by Saint Maurille and his retreat and death at Castellamare; the Angevins coming to look for his body and the return of his corpse to Angers.

Le vitrail de saint Charles Borromée. Bay 16
Borromée was the nephew of Pie IV and his representative at the Council of Trente and also served as the Bishop of Milan.  Beneath the window Vie de saint Borromée  is the tomb of Monseigneur de Lamarche, the Bishop of Léon, who died in 1892. The tomb is decorated with a triptych in gilded bronze which recalls that it was Monseigneur de Lamarche who pushed for the canonization of Dom Michel Le Nobletz and defended the cult of Saint Jean Discalcat.  Also here is a mural by Yann Dargent depicting Michel le Nobletz preaching about death and in this area are two sculptures depicting the Virgin Mary with child, both in white marble. One depicts Sainte Anne teaching the Virgin Mary, this by Buhors and executed in 1867 and the other is known as "Notre Dame d'Espėrance" and was executed by Ottin in 1846. The window is by Hirsch and dates to 1872. It has eight panels depicting scenes from Borromée's life.

The south choir

La chapelle de Saint-Paul. Bay 18
The Chapelle de Saint-Paul's altarpiece has bas-reliefs depicting Paul preaching before the Areopage and the conversion of Consul Sergius-Paulus. Also in this chapel is the tomb and gisant of Canon Pierre du Quenquis who died in 1459. These are carved from the granite quarried around Scaēr. The window in the chapel is called the "Vitrail du Père Maunoir" or "Missions Bretonnes de Michel Le Nobletz et de Julien Maunoir" by the artist Hubert de Sainte-Marie and the atelier at Quintin. It was ordered in 1952 by Monseigneur Fauvel and is dedicated to the life of the Breton missionary Maunoir. The chapel also holds murals painted by Dargent, one depicting Paul's conversion and the second Paul preaching in front of the Aeropage. The altar has a statue of Saint Peter on one side and Saint Paul on the other.

Chapelle de Saint-Jean Baptiste. Bay 20
This chapel was endowed by the Rosmadec family. It occupies bay 20. The altar is decorated with polychrome paintings and a bas-relief depicting the "Lamb of God" ("L'Agneau de Dieu"). The chapel contains the tomb and gisant of Monseigneur Bertrand de Rosmadec, who died in 1445 and served as chaplain to the dukes Jean IV and Jean V and played an important role in the construction of the cathedral. The chapel window, the "Vitrail de saint Jean-Baptiste", tells the story of John the Baptist's life over 16 individual panels. Panels include depictions of John the Baptist's retreat into the desert, the baptism of Jesus,  Salomė's dance and John the Baptist's beheading. The window dates to 1868 and was donated to the cathedral by Monseigneut Renė Nicolas Sergent and was the work of Hirsch, Erdmann and Kremer. In the tracery are the arms of Monseigneur Rėne Nicolas Sergent. Above the altar are murals painted by Yann Dargent which show John preaching on the banks of the Jordan river and his baptising Jesus. The chapel also contains statues of John the Evangelist and Saint Yves.

La chapelle Saint Joseph. Bay 22
Here in the chapel in bay 22, the altar has a tabernacle and the stained glass, a gift of Monseigneur Renė Nicolas Sergent, depicts in 10 panels the principle events of Saint Joseph's life. One of the panels is signed by E.Hirsh in 1868.  Two frescoes by Yann Dargent depict the death of Joseph and the flight into Egypt. The altar has statues of Saint Joseph and of Saint Joachim.

The Chapelle de Sainte-Anne. Bay 24
This chapel contains a stained glass window dedicated to Sainte Anne, the mother of the Virgin Mary. It is the work of Lobin of Tours. This depicts the visit of an angel to Anne, the presentation of Mary in the temple, and Anne teaching her daughter Mary to read. Depictions of Aaron and David are on either side. This window was a gift to the cathedral by Mme de Rivière in 1856. Above the altar are two Dargent frescoes. The fresco in the tympanum depicts Anne teaching Mary whilst in the fresco below Anne is shown visiting Mary at Nazareth. There is also a 17th-century wooden and gilded statue depicting Sainte Anne teaching Mary to read. The chapel altar is in onyx and is the work of Placide Poussielgue-Rusand. The altar is decorated with enamels depicting the appearance of the angel to Anne, the Virgin Mary's presentation at the temple and the Virgin Mary's education as a child. Below these are émaux ("enamels") depicting a bunch of roses and a bunch of lilies.

Vitrail du Saint Sacrement. Bay 26
After the Sainte Anne chapel we reach this two lancet window in bay 26, which has depictions on the left and right relating to the eucharist and was executed by Hirsch. It was  a gift to the cathedral from Monseigneur René Nicolas Sergent. The chapel is called the "Chapelle Saint-Antoine". In the window's tympanum is a depiction of a pelican feeding her young.

The south transept. Chapelle du Sacré Coeur
The Chapelle du Sacré Coeur in the south transept has an onyx altar by Placide Poussielgue-Rusand.  Bas-reliefs depict the appearance of the Sacré -Coeur to Marguerite Marie and John the Evangelist leaning across to speak confidentially to Jesus at the last supper. The chapel also holds statues of Saint Thomas Aquinas and Saint Bonaventure.

The south-facing part of the nave – lower level
In this part of the cathedral, we first encounter two stained glass windows, that relating to Saint Benoît and that relating to Saint Anselme. These were both commissioned by Monseigneur Dom Anselme Nouvel de la Flèche  shortly after he became bishop. Both are the work of the painter Émile Hirsch,

Vitrail narratif de la vie de saint Benoit. Bay 28
The Vitrail narratif de la vie de saint Benoît depicts scenes from the life of Saint Benoit in 20 medallions. Saint Benoît was the founder of the benedictine order of monks. It was this chapel that was often used by Catherine Daniélou a follower of Père Maunoir. This window is by Hirsch and dates to 1873.

Vitrail de saint Anselme. Bay 30

The "Vitrail de saint Anselme", again involving 20 medallions, depicts scenes from Saint Anselme's life. Anselme was the Abbė of Bec-Hellouin in Normandy and then Archbishop of Canterbury. The medallions include his taking Benedictine orders at the age of 28, his becoming the Archbishop of Canterbury, his visit to Urbain 11 and his death. Anselme was the patron saint of Monseigneur Anselme Nouvel de la Fleche. The window was not signed but is attributed to Hirsch and dated 1873.

The Great War memorial
In the area where the crossings lead to the episcopal palace is a monument devoted to those members of the clergy of Quimper and Léon who gave their lives in the 1914-1918 war, this decorated with a mosaic by Charles Wassem based on a drawing by Maurice Denis and dating to 1924. 50 priests had died and 51 seminarists. The mosaic depicts a dying soldier in the blue uniform of the French army being comforted by an angel. In front of this monument is the gisant of Monseigneur Duparc dating to 1946,.  He was the bishop of Quimper for many years. The gisant is in bronze and was sculpted by the Breton sculptor François Bazin (sculptor)

Chapelle de dévotion à Notre-Dame de Lourdes
In the Chapelle de dévotion à Notre-Dame de Lourdes is a painting depicting the Virgin Mary appearing to Bernadette Soubirous in the grotto of Massabielle (Sanctuary of Our Lady of Lourdes), This was the work of the atelier of Cachal-Fronc. The chapel also holds a relic of a hair of the Virgin Mary.

Grisaille. Bay 32
This is the second grisaille in the cathedral and is located under the south tour on the south wall. These lateral windows were normally put where the view of a window was partly obscured.

La chapelle de Sėpulcre. Bay 34

The La chapelle de Sėpulcre, also known as the Chapelle de la Madeleine and located directly under the south tower of the cathedral has a stained glass window depicting Jesus' arrest, condemnation and his death. This is known as the Vitrail de la Passion.  It is attributed to Hirsch and dated 1869. In the window's tracery, eight angels carry the instruments of the passion and in the very centre is the face of Jesus on Veronica's veil.  Also in the chapel is a 19th-century mise au tombeau, the replica of the famous mise au tombeau de Bourges.  This was the work of Froc-Robert and was installed in the cathedral in 1868. The work shows Jesus' body being prepared for burial and those depicted, apart from Jesus, are Joseph of Aramathea, John the Evangelist, Mary the mother of Jesus, Mary Magdaene, Marie Salomé, Mary the mother of John and Nicodemus.

The main altar
It was Monseigneur René Nicolas Sergent who pressed for an altar to match the grandeur of the cathedral and Mon.Boeswilwad , the architect- in- chief of "Monuments Historiques" was put in charge of the project.  He commissioned  the goldsmith Placide Poussielgue-Rusand to create the altar. Poussielgue-Rusand also worked on the altars in the Sacrė-Coeur, Sainte Anne and Saint Pierre chapels as well as the elaborate reliquary said to contain the arm of Saint Corentin. Poussielgue-Rusand's altar was in fact exhibited at the 1867 Exposition Universelle and was gifted to the town of Quimper by Napoleon III. The altar is consequently known as the L'autel d'Or or the autel Napolėon. This main altar was consecrated by Monseigneur René Nicolas Sergent  in 1868.

The stalls
The original stalls were made during the 15th century by the carpenters Pierre Le Gluydic, Hervė Calvez and the sculptor Jean Kerjagu and installed in the choir area. These stalls were ransacked and knocked about during the French revolution and then replaced in the 19th century by plainer stalls with little decoration.

Statues
There are four marble statues in the cathedral: The statue called "Vierge Mère dite Notre Dame d'Espérance", this by the sculptor Auguste Ottin and dating to 1846; the statue by Buors depicting Sainte Anne; the statue of Sainte Thérèse de Lisieux and the statue of Joan of Arc. The one statue in granite is the carving on the trumeau of the west portal depicting "Christ Sauveur du Monde". There are also statues carved from wood: the sculptor Mingham's Saint Christopher in polychromed wood;  a 16th-century group including Sainte Anne and the Virgin Mary with child; the statue of Saint Jean Discalcéat or Santig Du/Santik Du ("petit saint noir") dating to the 17th century. Finally, there are statues in alabaster including the statue of John the Baptist in the Baptistry and the altarpiece representing Sainte Catherine with a sword and skull, Sainte Marguerite with dragon and two abbesses.

The cathedral's stoups or bėnitiers
There is a 15th-century stoup near the sacristy door carved from kersanton stone and two stoups positioned at the entrance to the nave. The latter two are 19th-century and attributed to Corentin Quéré, a master mason, and take the form of angels at prayer. At the foot of the stoup's basin are banners containing the words in Latin and Breton which should accompany the act of making the sign of the cross on entering a church or cathedral.

Les clefs de voûtes

The clefs de voûtes/vaulting keystones decorating the vaulting have gained from the cathedral's recent restoration and there are innumerable coats of arms of the nobility and clerics to admire, especially of those who played a part in the cathedral's construction over the centuries. In the cathedral's many radiating chapels the keystones depict various types of leaves. Above the transept, the clefs de voûtes include the écu of François II, the last Duke of Bretagne and the écu of Canon Jean Le Baillif and the emblem of Monseigneur Alain Le Maout. Those above the nave include the coat of arms of Monseigneur Raoul Le Moël and Laurent de Groeskaër. Above the choir, the clefs de voûtes include the emblem of Jean V, the son of Jean de Montfort le Conquérant.

The cathedral's upper-level windows
The notes in Couffon's "Nouveau répertoire des églises et chapelles" include on page 35 a plan of the cathedral. This allocates a number to each window and to assist identification and navigation around the guide these numbers are used. See http://diocese-quimper.fr/archives/story/1164.

The upper-level windows of Quimper cathedral can be put into four groups.  The first group are the 13 windows in the upper level of the choir and the ambulatory. 5 are on the north side of the choir, 5 on the south side and 3 in the ambulatory area itself. These are windows 100 to 112 and date to 1417 to 1419. They were ordered by Jean V under the episcopacy of Gatien de Monceaux (1408 to 1416) and then the episcopacy of Bertrand de Rosmadec. The second group are the 16 upper windows of the transept and the nave dating from 1495 to 1497 in the reign of Charles VIII and Anne de Bretagne. These are windows 113 to 116 and 118 to 132.

The upper-level windows are as follows and again we shall move around the cathedral in a clock-wise direction-north nave-north transept-north choir-ambulatory-south choir-south transept-south nave.

The 5 upper windows of the north-facing nave (123/125/127/129 and 131)
The upper north-facing nave has 5 stained glass windows with another 5 on the upper south-facing nave. These windows are the work of Jamin Soyer, the son of the painter who had, 50 years earlier,  painted the windows in the upper choir area.

The "Tymeur" window. Window 123

The five lancet Window 123 is known as the "Vitrail du Tymeur" window as it honours the Tymeur family. In the first lancet, Saint Patern, the Bishop of Vannes, is depicted and the second lancet depicts John the Baptist with a noblewoman who bears the arms of Rosmadec in alliance with Tymeur. The third lancet carries a depiction of the Virgin Mary whilst in the fourth lancet Saint Michael is depicted with a cavalier bearing the arms of Tymeur. In the tracery are the arms of either Tymeur, or Tymeur in alliance with Léon, Rieux, Malestroit, Chastel and Juch.

The "Dresnay" window. Window 125

The five lancet Window 125 is known as the "Verrière du Dresnay". In the first lancet is the figure of a bishop, thought by some experts to be Saint Pol Aurélien and by others to be Saint Paul. In the second lancet, Yves du Dresnay, the cathedral canon from 1486 to 1497 and a significant benefactor of it is shown kneeling and being presented by an unidentified female saint. In the third lancet is the blind Saint Hervé and his legendary wolf. The image of Hervé was completely remade in 1998. The fourth lancet depicts a second donor to the cathedral, a noble of the Dresnay family. He kneels before a prie-Dieu and is presented by Saint-Yves. The fifth lancet depicts another noble presented by a Holy bishop. The window's tracery includes the Dresnay arms.

The "Kerloaguen" window. Window 127

This five lancet window has a "Vierge de pitié" in the third lancet. She wears a voluminous blue gown and the people in the other four lancets all turn their heads to her. In the first lancet Guillaume de Kerloaguen, an ex-canon Quimper, is kneeling and is presented by Saint Guillaume Pinchon who was the Bishop of St Brieuc. The Kerloaguen arms are displayed on the prie-Dieu. The kneeling figure in the second lancet is Pierre de Kerloaguen, Canon of Quimper from 1469 to 1497. He was the nephew and successor of Guillaume de Kerloaguen. He is presented by a bishop. An eagle is displayed on the prie-Dieu. In the fourth lancet is Saint Peter who was Pierre de Kerloaguen's patron saint. He holds a large key. The fifth lancet depicts the cathedral's benefactors Maurice de Kerloaguen and his wife Louise de Bréhet. They are presented by Sainte Marie l'Égyptienne. The tracery includes the Eagle of Kerloaguen and the Lion of Bréhet. The Kerloaguen manor was located at Plougonven.

Window 129

Window 129 was restored by Lusson between 1869 and 1870.  It has four lancets. In the first a Holy Bishop is depicted with a monk, in the second is a depiction of either James the Greater or Saint Roch. The third lancet depicts Our Lady with Jesus Christ whilst the fourth shows a Holy Bishop with a canon.

The "Groeskaër" window. Window 131

 
Window 131 is known as the "Vitrail de Laurent du Groeskaër". The window comprises four lancets. The first lancet depicts Saint Laurent holding the grill which was the instrument of his martyrdom in his left hand whilst his right-hand rests on the shoulder of the kneeling benefactor Laurent du Groeskaër, Canon of Quimper from 1489 to 1496. Saint Corentin appears in the second lancet dressed in the full attire of a bishop. In the third lancet, Mary Magdalene is depicted. She holds an open book and a pot of ointment. In the fourth and final lancet, Saint Michael is depicted fighting a dragon. In the tracery are various phylacteries some held by angels.

The 5 upper windows of the north transept (113/115/117/119 and 121)

Window 113, Vitrail de Jean Le Bailiff
This window is dedicated to Jean Le Baillif and was restored by Lusson between 1873 and 1874. The window has 5 panels or lancets. In the first, there is a depiction of Saint Corentin giving a blessing and in the second Saint Michael is depicted fighting a demon. The third features a squire holding a banner and shield. In the fourth panel Saint Christopher is shown carrying Jesus on his back and in the fifth, a kneeling Jean Le Bailiff is presented by John the Baptist. Jean Le Baillif was the cathedral's canon from 1447 to 1494. The window's tympanum holds the arms of Jean Le Baillif, the Ėcu of Lézongar de Pratantas and banners with the words "S MICHEL", "AMEN", "ORA PRO NOBIS" and "S CHRISTOPHE" and angels holding banners reading "S CORENTIN" and "S JEAN BAPTISTE".

Window 115, Baie du Gloria
This window has six panels. In the first is a depiction of John the Baptist and in the second a kneeling caped canon . The Virgin Mary with child appears in the third panel. In the fourth lancet is a cleric kneeling in prayer. In the fifth lancet is John the Evangelist and the sixth and final panel depicts Saint Christopher.

Window 117
This  is the "vitrail de la mission de 1868". The upper panels depict Saint Corentin, Saint Pol-Aurélien, Saint Guénolé, Saint Maurice, Saint Alor and Saint Conogan, whilst the lower panels depict Saint Ténénan, Saint Ronan, Saint Gouesnou, Saint Joévin, Saint Goulven and Saint Hoardon. The window carries the date 1869 and the names of a further 16 Breton saints.

Window 119. Verrière des du  Chastel 
This window is in the north transept and on the west wall. The window was restored by Lusson in 1873 and has six panels. These depict a martyred Franciscan friar carrying a sword, Saint Trémeur holding his severed head, Saint Jean Discalceat, Saint Andrew, John the Evangelist and Saint Joseph.  The arms of Chastel, Bretagne,  Pont-l’Abbé, Rostrenen, Poulmic, Chastel-Mesle, Coetlogon and Leslen complete the window.

Window 121  Verrière dite de Saint Charlemagne 
This window dates to 1496 and it situated in the north transept on the west wall. It has five panels. These depict Saint Pierre, a canon with a Holy Bishop, Saint Charlemagne, a canon with a saint and Saint Paul.

The upper-level windows of the choir
There are 13 stained glass windows in the upper choir area, 5 on the north-facing side, 5 on the south-facing side and 3 in the ambulatory and these were installed in the time of Monseigneur Bertrand de Rosmadec and when, from 1417 to 1419, the choir vaulting was installed. They are the work of the Quimper glass painter Jean Soyer (or Souhier) and were possible because of the largesse of the Breton nobility and church. These benefactors are shown in the 13 windows on their knees and in the company of their own particular patron saint.  The bishops, canons, lords and noblewomen are identified by their arms, these placed on a prie-Dieu when the person involved was a cleric, by a coat of arms for the nobles and on the robe of the noblewomen. The same insignia appears in the upper part of each window (the tympanum). Each panel is crowned by a richly decorated dais. The windows depicting the clerics are placed on the north side of the choir and the nobility on the south. These windows were restored by Lusson between 1867 and 1868.

The north-facing upper-level windows of the choir

Window 103. Saint Paul, Saint John the Baptist and Saint Pierre
This three-lancet window features Saint Paul, John the Baptist and Saint Pierre.

Window 105. Vitrail de Bertrand de Rosmadec
This four lancet window features Sainte Catherine d'Alexandrie in the first lancet. She holds a fragment of the wheel on which she was martyred. In lancet two bishops appear one kneeling. It is thought this is Bertrand de Rosmadec who was the Quimper bishop from 1416 to 1444.  The third lancet features a saint in a white robe and the fourth depicts the Virgin Mary with child.

Window 107. Olivier de l'Hôtellerie, Saints Pierre et Paul, La Trinité
This four lancet window features John the Baptist presenting a kneeling canon Olivier de l'Hôtellerie in the first lancet. Saint Pierre appears in the second lancet, Saint Paul in the third lancet wearing a green tunic and in the fourth lancet is God himself.

Window 111. Vitrail du Chanoine en Chape Bleue
This window of four lancets features four saints. In the first lancet is Saint Anthony with his legendary pig, in the second lancet is Saint James of Compostelle. In the third lancet, a canon is on his knees presented by an anonymous saint. The canon wears a blue cape. The Virgin Mary with child appears in the fourth lancet.

Window 112. Vitrail des Trémic-Bodigneau et des Tréanna
The benefactors of the Trémic-Bodigneau and Tréanna families are depicted on their knees and being presented by saints. 
In the first lancet a noblewoman is with Saint James of Compostelle, in the second an armed cavalier is with the Virgin Mary and child, in the third lancet another armed cavalier is presented by Saint-Yves and in the final lancet a kneeling noblewoman is with Saint Catherine.

The central section of the semicircular ambulatory or "rond-point"
This section has three stained glass windows those in Bay 101, 100  and 102.

Vitrail du Duc de Bretagne Jean V. Window 101
This window comprises three lancets. The central lancet is dedicated to Jean V (1399-1442) and celebrates his donations to the cathedral. The window, originally by Lusson was completely remade between 1992 and 1993. The workshop of Hubert de Sainte-Martin (Michaēl Messonnet) of Quintin were responsible for the depictions of the people represented. The original window which dated from 1416 to 1424 had, by 1820, almost completely disintegrated. In the first lancet of the remade window we see François, the Count of Monfort (1410 to 1450), the son of Jean V and the future François 1st of Bretagne (1442 to 1450). He kneels, hands clasped in prayer and dressed in armour. The phylactery reads DEUS, MISERE NOBIS. François' patron saint, standing behind him is Francis of Assisi. The saint's right hand rests on François' shoulder whilst his left hand is placed on his chest. The phylactery reads S,FRANCISCUS. They both look towards Saint Corentin who is depicted in the third lancet. In the second lancet and again kneeling in prayer is Jean V. He is being presented to Saint Corentin by Jean the Evangelist. He carries the flag of Brittany which bears the motto A MA VIE wrapped around the flagpole. The lancet also states S.JOHANNES. Saint Corentin then occupies the third lancet standing in a bishop's robe and wearing a mitre. He looks to the crucifixion in the next window to the left. He carries the episcopal cross and has a "poisson en fasce" painted on his chest. In the window's tracery are 5 angels. Jean V is in fact buried in Tréguier cathedral and ruled from 1399 to 1442.  François, Jean V's son in law who was the Duke of Bretagne from 1442 to 1450 when he was assassinated by his brother Giles.

The Vitrail de la Crucifixion. Window 100
This three-lancet window depicts Christ on the cross in the central lancet with Mary and John the Evangelist in the other two lancets.  The original panels were sold to a chateau in the southern part of France and the panels in the cathedral copied from the original, firstly in 1856 and then in 1992.  In the tympanum, angels are depicted holding the various instruments of the Passion.

Window 102. Vitrail de la Duchesse Jeanne de France
The third window of the choir area's "rond-point" , number 102, the "Vitrail de la duchesse Jeanne de France" is dedicated to the Duchess Jeanne de France. The window has three panels. In the first panel is the Virgin Mary with child and in the central panel Jeanne de France, duchesse de Bretagne from 1399 to 1433 is shown kneeling in front of John the Baptist. In the third lancet, Anne de Bretagne kneels and is presented by Sainte Anne.

The 5 upper-level windows on the south side of the choir
Now we reach the south side of the upper choir and encounter another five windows.

Window 104. Vitrai du Juch
This window was the work of Jami Sohier between 1418 and 1420 and was restored by Lusson between 1863 and 1867. The window has three panels. In the first Hervé du Juch is depicted with his wife. Both are kneeling and are in the company of Saint Hervé. In the second panel Hérve's son Henri du Juch and his wife are depicted with Saint Hervé and in the third panel an armed cavalier and his wife are shown with a bishop.

Window 106. Quatre Donateurs Présentés par leurs Saints Patron
This window features four benefactors of the cathedral, each being presented by their patron saint. In the first lancet, a kneeling fully armed cavalier of Bodigneau is presented by Saint Guénolé who was the first abbot of Landévennec. In the second lancet a kneeling noblewoman, Dame Catherine de Bodigneau,  is presented by Mary Magdalene. In lancet three another cavalier kneels, this one bearing the arms of Lézongar and Pratanras. He is presented by Saint Bartholomew. In the fourth lancet, a noblewoman of Lézongar of Pratanras is presented by Sainte Catherine. The window also bears the arms of Pratanras.

Window 108. Les Tréanna et leurs Saints Patrons
This window acknowledges the donations to the cathedral of the nobles Tréanna of the parish of Elliant. The first lancet features a kneeling Tréanna cavalier who is presented by his patron saint Saint Nicholas. In the second lancet, another cavalier is presented by Saint Derrien. Another cavalier appears in the third lancet. He appears to be from Bodigneau. The fourth lancet has a cavalier presented by Saint Hervé.

Window 109. Quatre Saints Médiévaux
This four lancet window features the crowned Saint Catherine in the first lancet, Sainte-Marguerite in the second lancet, Saint Julien l'Hospitalier in the third lancet and Saint George fighting the dragon in the fourth lancet.

Window 110. Vitrail de la seigneurie de Bodigneau
This window is dedicated to the noblemen and noblewomen of Bodigneau and the parish of Clohars-Fouesnant who donated to the cathedral. In the first panel a Holy bishop presents a noblewoman of Bodigneau, in the second panel John the Evangelist presents an armed and kneeling cavalier from Bodigneau. In panel three, John the Baptist presents another cavalier from Bodigneau and in the fourth panel the Virgin Mary presents a kneeling noblewoman from Bodigneau.

Window 112. The Trémic window
Window 112, the final window overlooking the choir area, represents the noblemen of Trémic in the parish of  Combrit. The window has four panels. The first panel depicts a noblewoman from Trémic in the company of James the Greater, the second a cleric with an armed cavalier from Tréanna, the third depicts the Virgin Mary with a chevalier from Trémic and in the final panel James the Greater is shown with a noblewoman whose insignia represents both Tréanna and Lanros.

The five upper windows of the south-facing transept

Upper window 114. The Pratanras family
This window is located on the east wall of the south-facing transept and has four lancets. In the first, Saint Pierre or Saint Peter presents a lord whose arms include those of the Pratanras and Guengat families. The second lancet has Saint Christopher presenting Christophe de Le
ézongar. The third depicts Saint Marthe with Christophe de Lézongar's wife whose maiden name was Kermeno. In the fourth lancet Saint Ronan presents Ronan de Lézongar. In window's tympanum includes the arms of Brittany, Lézongar-Pratanras, Gunegat, Pratanras and Kermeno.

Upper window 116, The Trėanna family
This window, also known as the Vitre des Chanoines Geffroy et Rioc de Tréanna, and situated in the south-facing transept's east wall, has five lancets. In the first, Saint Eloi with a hammer in his right hand is presenting Canon Geffre or Geffroy de Trėanna, archdeacon of Mans, rector of Crozon and canon of the cathedral from 1486 to 1496. The second lancet depicts Sainte Geneviève, the third Jesus on His Cross, the fourth Saint Martin giving up his cloak and the fifth Saint Anthony presenting Rioc de Tréanna, who served the cathedral as a canon in 1487, In the tympanum are the apostles which had previously decorated the apsidal chapel from 1837 to 1876.

Upper window 118. Vitrail de Raoul le Moël
It represents the last supper and was executed in 1868 by Hirsch and commissioned by Monseigneur Sergent. By 1904 the faces of Christ and the Apostles had faded completely.

Upper window 120. Vitrail de Jean de Lespervez
This window has four lancets. In the first lancet  Jean de Lespervez, the Bishop of Quimper from 1451 to 1471,  is depicted. In panel two is Jesus Christ, in the third John the Evangelist is shown holding a chalice and in the fourth Francis of Assisi. In the tympanum are the arms of the Lespervez and the motto of Jean de Lespervez "orphano tu eris adjutor"

Upper window 122. The Alain Le Maout window
In the first of five lancets is Saint Alain with Alain Le Maout. In the second Alain Le Maout in the third Saint Raoul with  Alain Le Maout. In the fourth is Raoul Le Moël the Bishop of Quimper from 1493 to 1501. The fifth depicts Saint Mathias, The window also contains the arms of Alain Maout and of Raoul Le Moël.

The five upper windows of the south-facing nave

Upper window 124.Verrière aux Cinq Saints
In the first lancet is a depiction of Saint Yves. In the second lancet is Saint James the Greater (known in Brittany as Saint Jacques de Turquie) holding a book and a bourbon. Saint Peter appears in lancet three with his key and John the Baptist features in the fourth lancet. The fifth and final lancet features Saint Louis who holds the crown of thorns. In the window's tympanum are the arms of Brittany, and of Bishops Alain Le Maout and Raoul Le Moël, Canons de Groeskaër and de Kerguelenen, of Dresnay, of Tréanna, of Kerloaguen, and of the Baron de Pont d'Abbe.

The "Kerguelenen" window. Window 126
Another five lancet window, Window 126  is known as the "Verrière de Kerguelenen". The first lancet depicts the Virgin Mary with child. The second features  Canon of Kerguelenen being presented by Saint Julien. Kerguelenen was the canon of the cathedral from 1489 to 1497 and the archdeacon of Poher. The third lancet depicts Saint Christopher with a child on his back presenting a Kerguelenen nobleman and In the fourth lancet, Sainte Barbe is depicted holding her tower and presenting a kneeling noblewoman. A bishop is depicted in the fifth lancet.

Upper window 128. The Verrière oiseaux
This window was restored by Lusson between 1869 and 1870. It has five lancets, the first showing John the Baptist with a noblewoman. The second lancet depicts Saint Christopher, the third depicts a kneeling canon although the saint presenting him has not been identified. In the fourth lancet a young cavalier is presented by a saint. The fifth lancet depicts John the Baptist.

Upper window 129. The Vitrail de Saint Maurice de Carnoët
It was restored in 1998. The first lancet depicts a priest on his knees before a prie-Dieu being presented by a Holy bishop. The second lancet depicts a saint, either Saint Maurice or Saint Jacques le Majeur. In the third lancet, the Virgin Mary is shown breastfeeding the baby Jesus In the fourth and final lancet a canon is presented by a Holy bishop. Various phylacteries appear in the tracery.

Upper window 130. Window dedicated to the nobles of Pont-L'Abbe
It was restored by Lusson and has four lancets. The first lancet depicts Saint Paul, his hand resting on the hilt of a sword. He is presenting a kneeling canon from Pont-l'Abbé. In the second lancet, a young chevalier is on his knees being presented by John the Evangelist who holds a chalice alive with snakes. In the third lancet, a female benefactor kneels, presented by a female martyr, possibly Sainte Marguerite. In the fourth lancet is a depiction of Saint Ronan in bishop's attire. The tracery includes the arms of both Pont-L'Abbé and Ploeuc.

Miscellaneous

Pulpit

The pulpit dates to 1680 and is the work of the carpenter Jean Michelet and the sculptor Olivier Daniel. On the pulpit and pulpit stairway are a series of panels decorated with scenes from the life of Saint Corentin.

Tombs and gisant in the cathedral

Seven of the tombs in the cathedral are listed. These are:-
 The tomb of Even de la Forết who died in 1290. This is the oldest tomb in the cathedral and de la Forết's remains are placed within an enfeu (a tomb placed within a wall) in the north wall of the apse chapel (apsidal chapel). The white stone tombstone which identifies the grave has his portrait and an epitaph inscribed on it.
 The granite tomb of Monseigneur Gatien de Morceaux, who died in 1416, has a gisant carved from white stone. This is also in the apse chapel. The tomb has lobed arches.
 The gisant and tomb of Bishop Geffroy Le Marec'h who died in 1318 is located in the south ambulatory beneath the Santik Du window
 Also in the south ambulatory and the Saint-Jean-Baptiste chapel is the tomb and gisant of Monseigneur Bertrand de Rosmadec who died in 1445 and was an important benefactor of the cathedral and took an important part in the cathedral's construction. The tomb carries the inscription "M : CCC : LXXX : III"
 In the chapel Saint-Paul is the tomb and gisant of Canon Pierre du Quenquis who died in 1459 and was another major benefactor of the cathedral. The tombstone and gisant are carved from granite quarried at Scaër.
 In the side of the nave is the tomb, carved from kersanton of Bishop Alain Le Maout who died in 1493. This tomb is located in the Chapelle de Sépulchre 
 In the baptistery (Chapelle des fonts baptismaux) is the tomb and gisant of Monseigneur Raoul Le Moēl who died in 1501.

Amongst the tombs unlisted are:-
 The tomb of Monseigneur Graveran who died in 1855 and was the work of the Nantes sculptor Ménard is located in the Saint Pierre chapel.
 The tomb in kersanton of Monseigneur René Sergent who died in 1871 is located In the Notre-Dame du Rosaire chapel. It is the work of the Lorient sculptor Le Brun. 
 Plaques recording the burial place of Bishop René du Louët who died in 1668 and Monseigneur Touissant Conen de Saint Luc, who died in 1790, are placed on either side of the axial chapel.
 The tomb of Monseigneur Lamarche who died in 1892 can be seen beneath the window dedicated to Charles Borromėe. The tomb is decorated with a gilded bronze triptych.
 The bronze tomb of Monseigneur Duparc, who died in 1946 is located in front of Maurice Denis' war memorial.
 The tombs of Monseigneur Yves Caballic, who died in 1280 and Canon Olivier de Conque are located in the Saint Frėdėric chapel.
 The tomb of Monseigneur Valleau, who died in 1898 and is marked by a silver medallion can be found in the Saint Roch chapel
 The tomb of Monseigneur Dom Anselme Nouvel de la Flēche, who died in 1887 is located in the Saint Corentin chapel and Bishop Alain Rivelen, who died in 1299 in the cathedral's Notre Dame de la Victoire chapel.
 The tomb of Monseigneur Francis Barbu, who died in 1991 and is the last bishop buried in the cathedral, is marked by a medallion executed by P.Toulhoat and located the Trois Goutes de sang chapel.

Time-line
The episcopacy of Bishop Rainaud ran from 1218 to 1245. In 1239 Renaud presided over the reconstruction of the choir and the reattachment of the Notre-Dame de la Victoire chapel which became the cathedral's apse or abside.

The episcopacy of Bishop Yves Cabellic ran from 1267 to 1280. In this period further changes were made to the choir.

The episcopacy of Bishop Alain Rivelain ran from 1290 to 1320. From 1285 to 1295 the apsidial chapel was reconstructed and the Altar was consecrated.

The episcopacy of Bishop Alain Gontier ran from 1334 to 1335. 1335 saw the construction of the south aisle of the chapel.

The episcopacy of Bishop Gatien de Monceaux ran from 1408 to 1416.  This period saw the vaulting added to the choir area.

The episcopacy of Bishop Bertrand de Rosmadec ran from 1416 to 1444. In 1417 the vaulting was painted by Jestin, 1424 saw the beginning of the nave's construction and on 26 July 1414 the first stone of the towers was laid.

The episcopacy of Bishop Jean de Lespervez ran from 1451 to 1472 and in 1460 the nave was finished. In 1464 the vaulting of the side aisles of the nave was completed and in 1467 the south crossing of the transept was covered and the alignment of nave with choir was finished. 1469 saw a wooden bell-tower covered in lead constructed 50 feet above the transept.

The episcopacy of Bishop Thebaud de Rieux ran from 1472 to 1479. 1475 saw the construction of the north crossing of the transept. This was finished in 1486.

The episcopacy of Bishop Alain Le Maout ran from 1484 to 1493. From 1487 to 1493 saw the building of the vaulting of the transept and nave. 1494 saw the construction of the mullions constructed for the upper nave windows, the balustrades, the galleries and the pinnacles. Around this time some of the stained glass was executed by Jean Sohier.

The episcopacy of Bishop Claude de Rohan from 1501 to 1540. In 1514 the ossuary was constructed. This was demolished in 1840

The episcopacy of Bishop Guillaume Les Prestre de Lezonnet ran from 1614 to 1640. In 1620 one of the spires caught fire,

The episcopacy of Bishop Rene du Louet ran from 1640 to 1668. In 1644 the organ was constructed.

The episcopacy of Bishop Francois de Coetlogon ran from 1668 to 1706. In 1679 the pulpit was built ("Chaire à prêcher") by the sculptor Olivier Daniel.

The episcopacy of Bishop Joseph Graveran ran from 1840 to 1855. 1 May 1854 saw the first stone of the spires laid.

The episcopacy of Bishop Rene Sergent ran from 1855 to 1871. On 10 August 1856 the spires were completed and the scaffolding removed.

1857 to 1859 saw the reconstruction of the sacristy.

1860 saw the completion of the upper gallery.

Between 1862 and 1867 the church was whitewashed.

In 1866 the trumeau and tympanum of the west portal were repaired.  In 1868 the master altar was consecrated.

From 1856 to 1874 there was considerable work carried out on the stained glass windows.

The episcopacy of Bishop Dom Anselme Nouvel de la Flèche  ran from 1872 to 1887. In the period 1870-1883 Yann Dargent completed the frescoes in the lateral naves.

1885 saw the restoration of the absidial chapel by Bigot and a new consecration of the altar.

1886 saw the introduction of the relic of Saint Corentin's arm into the chapel.

Cloisters and exhibits from the Breton Museum

Part of the cloisters are preserved on the south side of the cathedral together with some old tombstones from an earlier burial ground. The nearby Breton Museum has also placed some pieces of sculpture in the space between the museum and the cloisters. One of these sculptures is a "statue gėminėe" featuring John the Evangelist and Saint Peter taken from a calvary which had stood at Coat-Quėau in Scrignac. It is carved from granite and dates to the 16th century. Sculptors employed on calvaries at that time used the technique of the "statue gėminėe" when carving pieces for the crosspieces of crosses and would carve two back to back figures from one piece of stone. The figures from Scrignac show how the two figures are in fact carved from the one piece.

Further reading
La cathédrale Saint-Corentin Quimper. Cathedral guidebook published by the Association César Franck with text by Phillipe Argenton.

See also
List of works of the two Folgoët ateliers
 Joseph Bigot

Tro Breizh
Quimper cathedral is one of the seven cathedrals and basilicas covered by the "Tro Breizh" pilgrimage. See also

Église Saint-Patern de Vannes

Dol Cathedral

Saint-Brieuc Cathedral

Tréguier Cathedral

Saint-Pol-de-Léon's Cathedral of Saint Paul Aurélien, the Notre-Dame du Kreisker Chapel and the Chapelle Saint-Pierre and cemetery

Saint-Malo Cathedral

References

External links

Location
Images of Quimper Cathedral
Images of Quimper Cathedral
Images of Quimper Cathedral
Virtual Tour of Quimper Cathedral

Churches in Finistère
Basilica churches in France
Roman Catholic cathedrals in France
Tro Breizh
Monuments historiques of Finistère
Quimper